Mehdi Raza Hasan (born July 1979) is a British-American political journalist, broadcaster and best-selling author. He has presented The Mehdi Hasan Show on Peacock since October 2020 and on MSNBC since February 2021.

In 2015, Hasan moved to Washington, D.C., United States, to work full-time for Al Jazeera on UpFront and host the Deconstructed podcast produced by the online publication The Intercept from 2018 to 2020.

Hasan is the author of Win Every Argument, and the co-author of a biography of Ed Miliband and was formerly the political editor of the UK edition of The Huffington Post and the presenter of the Al Jazeera English shows: The Café, Head to Head and UpFront.

Early life and education
Mehdi Raza Hasan was born in Swindon to immigrant Indian Hyderabadi Shia Muslim parents from the city of Hyderabad in Andhra Pradesh, South India (now in Telangana).

Hasan was privately educated at Merchant Taylors' School, Northwood, a day independent school for boys at Sandy Lodge in the Three Rivers District of Hertfordshire, near the town of Northwood in North West London. He then attended Christ Church, Oxford, where he read Philosophy, Politics and Economics (PPE), and graduated in 2000.

Career
Hasan worked as a researcher and then producer on LWT's Jonathan Dimbleby programme, with a brief period in between on BBC One's The Politics Show. Following this, he became deputy executive producer on Sky's breakfast show Sunrise before moving to Channel 4 as their editor of news and current affairs. He was appointed senior editor for politics at the New Statesman in late spring of 2009, where he stayed until May 2012, then becoming political director of The Huffington Post website.

Hasan became a presenter on Al Jazeera's English news channel in May 2012. Hasan has appeared (six times) on the BBC's Question Time programme, and the Sunday morning programmes The Big Questions and Sunday Morning Live.

In 2013, Hasan took part in a debate at the Oxford Union to consider whether Islam is a peaceful religion. Hasan, who is an Ithna’Asheri Shia Muslim,  vouched for Islam as a religion of peace, citing political and cultural reasons for violence in Muslim majority countries, as opposed to holding the religion of Islam responsible. In the vote on the motion, the house affirmed with Hasan and the other proposers that Islam is a religion of peace with 286 votes in favor and 168 votes against.

Recorded at the Oxford Union, Head to Head was a programme on Al Jazeera English in which Hasan interviewed public figures; it had run for three series by December 2014. Since 2015, working full-time for the network in Washington, D.C., Hasan has hosted a weekly interview and discussion programme.

Hasan began a podcast in 2018 entitled Deconstructed, produced by the investigative journalism website The Intercept. On air, Hasan would discuss recent news topics and host guests. Notable topics covered on the podcast include police brutality, inequality, QAnon, and President Donald Trump's activity on Twitter. Notable podcast guests have included Noam Chomsky, Ilhan Omar, and Bernie Sanders. On 2 October 2020, Hasan announced that he would no longer host the show as part of his move to host The Mehdi Hasan Show on NBC's new streaming service, Peacock.

Hasan became a naturalized citizen of the United States on 9 October 2020, in time to vote in the 2020 United States presidential election.

Hasan currently hosts The Mehdi Hasan Show on the online service Peacock since Oct 2020 airing weeknights at 7 pm Eastern. Notable guests on The Mehdi Hasan Show have included Mark Ruffalo, Jon Stewart, John Bolton, Keith Ellison, Ro Khanna, John Legend, and Alexandria Ocasio-Cortez.

In March 2021, Hasan launched the same show on MSNBC every Sunday evening. He is also the fill-in host on MSNBC's All In with Chris Hayes, The Rachel Maddow Show, The 11th Hour with Stephanie Ruhle and The Last Word with Lawrence O'Donnell.

Views and opinions

Iraq 
In a 14 February 2013 article for the New Statesman, Hasan wrote:
The Iraq war was a strategic disaster – or, as the Tory minister Kenneth Clarke put it in a recent BBC radio discussion, 'the most disastrous foreign policy decision of my lifetime ... worse than Suez'. The invasion and occupation of the country undermined the moral standing of the western powers; empowered Iran and its proxies; heightened the threat from al-Qaeda at home and abroad; and sent a clear signal to 'rogue' regimes that the best (the only?) means of deterring a pre-emptive, US-led attack was to acquire weapons of mass destruction. ... Iraq has been destroyed and hundreds of thousands of innocent people have lost their lives, as the direct result of an unnecessary, unprovoked war that, according to the former chief justice Lord Bingham, was a 'serious violation of international law'.

Iran 
A regular contributor to The Guardian, Hasan argued in November 2011 regarding the issue of Iran's alleged pursuit of nuclear weapons: "Wouldn't it be rational for Iran – geographically encircled, politically isolated, feeling threatened – to want its own arsenal of nukes, for defensive and deterrent purposes?" Pointing out the difference between America, and its allies, going to "war with non-nuclear Iraq" and their "diplomacy with nuclear-armed North Korea", Hasan concluded: "The simple fact is there is no alternative to diplomacy, no matter how truculent or paranoid the leaders of Iran might seem to western eyes."

Hasan wrote an article in The Guardian in September 2011 condemning the Iranian government for its proposed execution of Youcef Nadarkhani, who had been arrested on charges of apostasy. "The death sentence given to Youcef Nadarkhani in Iran is an affront to universal moral values and a disservice to Muslims."

Islam and Muslims
Hasan, a Shia Muslim, has written articles about Islam and Muslims for the New Statesman and newspapers. "My Islamic faith is based on the principles of peace, moderation and mercy", he wrote in September 2012. He also said that while Muslims "have every right to be angry", such "anger, however, is not an excuse for extremism."

In April 2009, Hasan argued against the concept and idea of an Islamic state. He argues that "Today it is difficult, if not impossible, to identify a Muslim-majority nation that could plausibly be identified as a modern, viable and legitimate 'Islamic state'" and that "contrary to popular Muslim opinion, there is not a shred of theological, historical or empirical evidence to support the existence of such an entity."

In November 2009, Hasan wrote a column denouncing suicide bombing from an Islamic perspective. Hasan argued that "There is, in fact, nothing Islamic about so-called Islamic terrorism… So why are many Muslims so reluctant to condemn such cold-blooded tactics of terror?"

In April 2010, Hasan wrote a piece condemning the controversial Islamic advocacy of the death penalty for apostasy in the New Statesman. He states that "The sharia (or Islamic law), it is claimed, sanctions the death penalty for any adult Muslim who chooses to leave the faith, or apostatise. This is an intellectually, morally and, perhaps above all, theologically unsustainable position."

In January 2012, Hasan wrote a piece emphasizing the importance of acknowledging the Holocaust as a "uniquely horrific crime against humanity," and called on British Muslims and the larger Muslim world to take it more seriously. 

In April 2012, Hasan wrote an article criticising British Muslims for an apparent fixation with issues relating to foreign affairs and the anti-war movement. He criticised British Muslims' apparent apathy towards national issues: "Why is it that most British Muslims get so excited and aroused by foreign affairs, yet seem so bored by and uninterested in domestic politics and the economy?"

Following allegations of Jewish conspiracy by British peer Lord Ahmed in March 2013, Hasan referred to antisemitism in the British Muslim community as being "routine and commonplace".

In May 2013, he appeared at an Oxford Union debate proposing a motion arguing that Islam is a religion of peace. The motion was carried.

Following the 2017 Westminster attack, Hasan wrote an article in The Intercept criticising what he referred to as the "common stereotype of the Middle Eastern, Muslim-born terrorist." He pointed out that the perpetrator of the attack, Khalid Masood, was born and raised in the United Kingdom and, therefore, would not have been affected by any immigration ban. He also pointed out that Masood converted to Islam late in life and had a history of criminality prior to his conversion. Hasan concluded, ergo, that while "a distorted, simplistic and politicized form of Islam" provided the justification for Masood's actions, the main motivation lay in "social networks and family ties; issues of identity and belonging; a sense of persecution; mental illness; socio-economic grievances; moral outrage over conflict and torture; a craving for glory and purpose, action and adventure." Hasan also referenced a 2008 leaked report by researchers for MI5, a 2010 Demos study, and a 2016 Egmont study, that came to similar conclusions "challeng[ing] the conventional... wisdom on the role of religion in the radicalization process."

Coverage in the media
Hasan has stated that the media should be sanctioned for "dishonest, demonising press coverage" of Muslims and other minorities, saying: "I'm all in favour of free speech and the robust criticism of all religious beliefs. But it's the made-up stories and the smearing of individuals and whole communities that I have an issue with. Why isn't anti-Muslim bigotry as unacceptable in the press as anti-Jewish bigotry?"

In October 2013, on the BBC's Question Time, Hasan claimed that the Daily Mail was, among other accusations, "Muslim-smearing". The paper responded by claiming that he had applied to write a column for them in 2010, praising their editorial standards and some of their positions.

In December 2019, Seth Meyers called Hasan's interrogation of Trump supporter Steve Rogers "the template for talking to people within the Trump-sphere."

In November 2020, the Daily Beast said "The Mehdi Hasan Show has fast become one of the most satisfying nightly news programs in America."

In a March 2021 interview with Esquire, Hasan said "journalists should have a bias in favor of democracy" and if journalists are "not pro-democracy, then what is the point of being a journalist?"

Abortion
Hasan has defended his anti-abortion views in print, writing "What I would like is for my fellow lefties and liberals to try to understand and respect the views of those of us who are pro-life" in an October 2012 online column for the New Statesman. Hasan argued that the issue of abortion "is one of those rare political issues on which left and right seem to have swapped ideologies: right-wingers talk of equality, human rights and 'defending the innocent', while left-wingers fetishise 'choice', selfishness and unbridled individualism." He later regretted expressing himself in this way. However, the article gained much attention on Twitter and Hasan debated the issue with Suzanne Moore on BBC Radio 4's Today programme.

Telegraph blogger Brendan O'Neill thought both Hasan and his pro-choice opponents shared the modern left's "instinct for paternalism" which contrasted, he asserted, with the pre-occupations of radicals a century ago, an era in which such figures, Hasan asserted, often opposed abortion. Meanwhile, Labour MP Diane Abbott thought that "any feminist, worth the name, knows that control over [our] own bodies is ground zero for every educational, social and economic advance that women have made in the last century". Cristina Odone wrote: "...there is no greater intolerance than that of the so-called tolerant liberals: pro-choice advocates will not allow any discussion of abortion that questions the status quo. Poor Hasan ventured into terrain marked "taboo".

In a 2020 series of tweets, Hasan expressed regrets for "having expressed offensive & illiberal views in the past on everything from homosexuality to abortion" and stated that they were views he no longer holds.

Pakistan 
Hasan has been critical of the human rights situation in Pakistan, expressing disapproval of the country's treatment of minorities including its blasphemy law, as well as enforced disappearances in Balochistan. He has also criticised the human rights situation in both Indian and Pakistan-administered Kashmir, and has called out alleged backing from Pakistan for terror groups like Jaish-e-Muhammad and Lashkar-e-Taiba to carry out attacks in the Indian-administered region.

In a May 2021 interview with CNN regarding the Israeli-Palestinian conflict, Pakistan's Foreign Minister Shah Mahmood Qureshi said that Israelis "are very influential people”, adding, “I mean, they control media.” Hasan tweeted during the ensuing controversy: “I see some people trying to defend the Pakistani foreign minister’s remarks as anti-Israeli & not anti-Semitic but let’s be clear: if you are accusing Israelis of having ‘deep pockets’ and ‘controlling’ the media, then yeah, you're invoking some pretty anti-Semitic slurs. Sorry.”

Saudi Arabia 
Hasan has made several statements in opposition to the Saudi government, including challenging a statement made by Donald Trump, in which he claimed that he himself had no financial interests in Saudi Arabia, an allegation which Trump called "fake news". Hasan challenged Trump's statements in a video essay published by The Intercept in October 2018.

In February 2019, during a debate organised by Intelligence Squared in London, Hasan stated that the West should cut ties with Saudi Arabia, saying "It's time we make clear that the West needs to cut its ties with Saudi Arabia, especially military ties, arms exports, weapons, bombs". The comments were made in response to the assassination of Jamal Khashoggi, allegedly ordered by the Crown Prince of Saudi Arabia, Mohammad Bin Salman, as well as several human rights violations which Hasan cited as also being carried out by Saudi Arabia. Hasan had previously interviewed Khashoggi about freedom of speech in Saudi Arabia.

George W. Bush 
Hasan has argued that George W. Bush committed war crimes during his presidency in Iraq, Afghanistan, and Pakistan.

Controversy
During a sermon delivered in 2009, quoting a verse of the Quran, Hasan used the terms "cattle" and "people of no intelligence" to describe non-believers. In another sermon, he used the term "animals" to describe non-Muslims. 

In response to criticism for his remarks, Hasan wrote in his New Statesman blog: "The Quranic phrase 'people of no intelligence' simply and narrowly refers to the fact that Muslims regard their views on God as the only intellectually tenable position, just as atheists (like Richard Dawkins or Sam Harris) regard believers as fundamentally irrational and, even, mentally deficient." Hasan returned to this issue in August 2012 following criticism from the columnist Peter Hitchens, stating that "the entire 45-minute speech is primarily an attack on Muslim extremists who try and justify violence against non-Muslims on an 'ends justify the means' basis", but noted of his 2009 comments that his "phraseology was ill-judged, ill-advised and, even, inappropriate".

Awards 
In January 2014, Hasan was awarded the Services to Media award at the British Muslim Awards. In 2017, he was named European Young Leader by the Brussels-based Friends of Europe think tank.

In 2019, Hasan won the Society of Professional Journalists' Sigma Delta Chi Award for Online Column Writing.

Selected works
 With James Macintyre. Ed: The Milibands and the making of a Labour leader, London, Biteback Publishing, 2011. 
 Summer of Unrest: The Debt Delusion: Exposing ten Tory myths about debts, deficits and spending cuts, Vintage Digital, 28 July 2011.
 Win Every Argument: The Art of Debating, Persuading, and Public Speaking. Henry Holt and Co. 2023. ISBN 9781250853479

Notes

References

External links

Hasan at the New Statesman
Hasan on C-SPAN
Mehdi Hasan at Al Jazeera English
Mehdi Hasan on George H. W. Bush

1979 births
20th-century American journalists
20th-century Muslims
21st-century American male writers
21st-century British journalists
21st-century British male writers
21st-century Muslims
Al Jazeera people
Alumni of Christ Church, Oxford
American Shia Muslims
American male journalists
American non-fiction writers
American people of Indian descent
British Shia Muslims
British expatriates in the United States
British male journalists
British people of Indian descent
HuffPost writers and columnists
Living people
MSNBC people
Naturalized citizens of the United States
People educated at Merchant Taylors' School, Northwood